Eagle Creek Park is the largest park in Indianapolis, and one of the largest municipal parks in the United States. Eagle Creek Park serves primarily as a nature reserve. Before coming into the possession of Indianapolis, the land was owned by Purdue University, and by Josiah K. Lilly Jr. before that. The Eagle Creek Park Foundation serves to promote volunteerism and provide funding for the Park and its programs.

Eagle Creek Park has hosted a number of notable sporting events, including the NCAA Rowing Championships (2002, 2003, 2013, 2014, and 2019) and the World Rowing Championships (1994). The park served as venue for the Archery, Canoeing, Modern Pentathlon, and Rowing competitions of the 1987 Pan American Games.

Eagle Creek Park is among the most visited attractions in Indianapolis, with 1.2 million guests in 2019.

Park attractions
{
  "type": "ExternalData",
  "service": "geoshape",
  "ids": "Q2483461",
  "properties": {
    "title": "Eagle Creek Park",
    "description": "",
    "stroke": "#125123",
    "stroke-width": 3,
    "fill": "#2aaf4d"
  }
}
 Amphitheater
 Bait shop
 Bark Park
 Boat ramp and slips
 Cross-Country skiing paths
 Earth Discovery Center
 Fitness course
 Fishing areas
 Go Ape Treetop Adventure
 Golf course (36 hole)
 Indianapolis Rowing Center
 Lilly Lake Pedal
 Marsh and Bird sanctuary
 Orienteering
 Ornithology Center
 Peace Learning Center
 Picnic areas and shelters
 Pistol Range
 Pontoon and Sunset Canoe Trips
 Retreat Centers (2)
 Sailboat marina
 Sailboat, rowboat, and canoe rentals
 Sailing Day Camp
 State Nature Preserves (2)
 Swim Beach
 Woodland Wildlife Preserve

Gallery

See also
List of urban parks by size
List of parks in Indianapolis
List of attractions and events in Indianapolis
List of nature centers in Indiana

References

External links

Eagle Creek Park Home
Eagle Creek Park Foundation
Peace Learning Center

Urban public parks
Parks in Indianapolis
Nature centers in Indiana
1962 establishments in Indiana